Jim Fox (born 1953 in Indiana) is an American composer, and also founder and director of the recording label Cold Blue. His compositions, often for small and unusual instrumentations (e.g., The City the Wind Swept Away is scored for piano, solo strings, two trombones and two bass trombones), are slow, creating tension and interest through unpredictable change within a generally repetitive idiom. Fox studied composition with Phil Winsor at DePaul University, Chicago. He also studied composition as a postgraduate with Barney Childs and taught electronic music, orchestration, and acoustics at the University of Redlands.

Recorded Compositions

Colorless sky became fog (Cold Blue CB0036)
The pleasure of being lost (Innova 846)
Descansos, past (Cold Blue CB0021)
The City the Wind Swept Away (Cold Blue CB0015)
Between the Wheels (Cold Blue CB0009)
Appearance of Red (Cold Blue CB0008)
Among Simple Shadows (Cold Blue CB0005)
All Fall Down (CRI 866)
The Copy of the Drawing (Cold Blue CB0001)
Last Things (Cold Blue CB0001)
Ballad of a Gunfighter (filmscore) (Citadel STC 77119)
Between the Wheels (Raptoria Caam RCD 1001)
Solo for Single Reed Instrument (Advance Recordings FGR-13)

See also 
List of ambient music artists

References

Living people
American male composers
21st-century American composers
1953 births
21st-century American male musicians